James Smith was an American baseball catcher in the Negro leagues. He played with the Newark Eagles in 1943.

References

External links
 and Seamheads

Newark Eagles players
Year of birth missing
Year of death missing
Baseball catchers